Fallen angels are angels who were expelled from heaven. The literal term "fallen angel" doesn't appear in any Abrahamic religious texts, but is used to describe angels cast out of heaven or angels who sinned. Such angels often tempt humans to sin.

The idea of fallen angels derived from the Book of Enoch, a Jewish pseudepigraph, or the assumption that the "sons of God" mentioned in Genesis 6:1–4 are angels. In the period immediately preceding the composition of the New Testament, some sects of Judaism, as well as many Christian Church Fathers, identified these same "sons of God" as fallen angels. During the late Second Temple period the biblical giants were sometimes considered the monstrous offspring of fallen angels and human women. In such accounts, God sends the Great Deluge to purge the world of these creatures; their bodies are destroyed, yet their peculiar souls survive, thereafter roaming the earth as demons. Rabbinic Judaism and Christian authorities after the third century rejected the Enochian writings and the notion of an illicit union between angels and women producing giants. Christian theology indicates the sins of fallen angels occur before the beginning of human history. Accordingly, fallen angels became identified with those led by Lucifer in rebellion against God, also equated with demons. 

Evidence for the belief in fallen angels among Muslims can be traced back to reports attributed to some of the companions of Muhammad, such as Ibn Abbas (619–687) and Abdullah ibn Masud (594–653). On the other hand, some Islamic scholars opposed the belief in fallen angels by stressing the piety of angels supported by verses of Quran, such as 16:49 and 66:6, although none of these verses declare angels as immune from sin. One of the first opponents of the concept of fallen angels was the early and influential Islamic ascetic Hasan of Basra (642–728). To support the doctrine of infallible angels, he pointed at verses which stressed the piety of angels, while simultaneously reinterpreting verses which might imply acknowledgement of fallen angels. For that reason, he read the term mala'ikah (angels) in reference to Harut and Marut, two possible fallen angels mentioned in 2:102, as malikayn (kings) instead of malā'ikah (angels), depicting them as ordinary men and advocated the belief that Iblis was a jinn and had never been an angel before. The precise degree of angelic fallibility is not clear even among scholars who accepted fallen angels; according to a common assertion, impeccability applies only to the messengers among angels or as long as they remain angels.

Academic scholars have discussed whether or not the Quranic jinn are identical to the biblical fallen angels. Although the different types of spirits in the Quran are sometimes hard to distinguish, the jinn in Islamic traditions seem to differ in their major characteristics from fallen angels.

Second Temple period 
The concept of fallen angels derives mostly from works dated to the Second Temple period between 530 BC and 70 AD: in the Book of Enoch, the Book of Jubilees and the Qumran Book of Giants; and perhaps in Genesis 6:1–4. A reference to heavenly beings called "Watchers" originates in Daniel 4, in which there are three mentions, twice in the singular (v. 13, 23), once in the plural (v. 17), of "watchers, holy ones". Some scholars consider it most likely that the Jewish tradition of fallen angels predates, even in written form, the composition of Gen 6:1–4. In the Book of Enoch, these Watchers "fell" after they became "enamored" with human women. The Second Book of Enoch (Slavonic Enoch) refers to the same beings of the (First) Book of Enoch, now called Grigori in the Greek transcription. Compared to the other Books of Enoch, fallen angels play a less significant role in 3 Enoch. 3 Enoch mentions only three fallen angels called Azazel, Azza and Uzza. Similar to The first Book of Enoch, they taught sorcery on earth, causing corruption. Unlike the first Book of Enoch, there is no mention of the reason for their fall and, according to 3 Enoch 4.6, they also later appear in heaven objecting to the presence of Enoch.

1 Enoch 

According to 1 Enoch 7.2, the Watchers become "enamoured" with human women and have intercourse with them. The offspring of these unions, and the knowledge they were giving, corrupt human beings and the earth (1 Enoch 10.11–12). Eminent among these angels are Shemyaza, their leader, and Azazel. Like many other fallen angels mentioned in 1 Enoch 8.1–9, Azazel introduces men to "forbidden arts", and it is Azazel who is rebuked by Enoch himself for illicit instruction, as stated in 1 Enoch 13.1. According to 1 Enoch 10.6, God sends the archangel Raphael to chain Azazel in the desert Dudael as punishment. Further, Azazel is blamed for the corruption of earth:

An etiological interpretation of 1 Enoch deals with the origin of evil. By shifting the origin of mankind's sin and their misdeeds to illicit angel instruction, evil is attributed to something supernatural from without. This motif, in 1 Enoch, differs from that of later Jewish and Christian theology; in the latter evil is something from within. According to a paradigmatic interpretation, 1 Enoch might deal with illicit marriages between priests and women. As evident from Leviticus 21:1–15, priests were prohibited to marry impure women. Accordingly, the fallen angels in 1 Enoch are the priests counterpart, who defile themselves by marriage. Just like the angels are expelled from heaven, the priests are excluded from their service at the altar. Unlike most other apocalyptic writings, 1 Enoch reflects a growing dissatisfaction with the priestly establishments in Jerusalem in 3rd century BC. The paradigmatic interpretation parallels the Adamic myth in regard of the origin of evil: In both cases, transcending ones own limitations inherent in their own nature, causes their fall. This contrasts the etiological interpretation, which implies another power besides God, in heaven. The latter solution therefore poorly fits into monotheistic thought. Otherwise, the introduction to illicit knowledge might reflect a rejection of foreign Hellenistic culture. Accordingly, the fallen angels represent creatures of Greek mythology, which introduced forbidden arts, used by Hellenistic kings and generals, resulting in oppression of Jews.

2 Enoch 
The concept of fallen angels is also in the Second Book of Enoch. It tells about Enoch's ascent through the layers of heaven. During his journey, he encounters fallen angels imprisoned in the 2nd heaven. At first, he decides to pray for them, but refuses to do so, since he himself as merely human, would not be worthy to pray for angels. In the 5th heaven however, he meets other rebellious angels, here called Grigori, remaining in grief, not joining the heavenly hosts in song. Enoch tries to cheer them up by telling about his prayers for their fellow angels and thereupon they join the heavenly liturgy.

Strikingly, the text refers to the leader of the Grigori as Satanail and not as Azael or Shemyaza, as in the other Books of Enoch. But the Grigori are identified with the Watchers of 1 Enoch.

The narration of the Grigori in 2 Enoch 18:1–7, who went down on to earth, married women and "befouled the earth with their deeds", resulting in their confinement under the earth, shows that the author of 2 Enoch knew about the stories in 1 Enoch. The longer recension of 2 Enoch, chapter 29 refers to angels who were "thrown out from the height" when their leader tried to become equal in rank with the Lord's power (2 Enoch 29:1–4), an idea probably taken from Ancient Canaanite religion about Attar, trying to rule the throne of Baal. The equation of an angel called Satanail with a deity trying to usurp the throne of a higher deity, was also adapted by later Christian in regard to the fall of Satan.

Jubilees 

The Book of Jubilees, an ancient Jewish religious work, accepted as canonical by the Ethiopian Orthodox Church and Beta Israel, refers to the Watchers, who are among the angels created on the first day. However, unlike the (first) Book of Enoch, the Watchers are commanded by God to descend to earth and to instruct humanity. It is only after they copulate with human women that they transgress the laws of God. These illicit unions result in demonic offspring, who battle each other until they die, while the Watchers are bound in the depths of the earth as punishment. In Jubilees 10:1, another angel called Mastema appears as the leader of the evils spirits. He asks God to spare some of the demons, so he might use their aid to lead humankind into sin. Afterwards, he becomes their leader: 

Both the (first) Book of Enoch and the Book of Jubilees include the motif of angels introducing evil to humans. However, unlike the Book of Enoch, the Book of Jubilees does not hold that evil was caused by the fall of angels in the first place, although their introduction to sin is affirmed. Further, while the fallen angels in the Book of Enoch are acting against God's will, the fallen angels and demons in the Book of Jubilees seem to have no power independent from God but only act within his power.

Rabbinic Judaism

Early Rabbinic Literature 
Although the concept of fallen angels developed from Judaism during the Second Temple period, rabbis from the second century onward turned against the Enochian writings, probably in order to prevent fellow Jews from worship and veneration of angels. Thus, while many angels were individualized and sometimes venerated during the Second Temple period, the status of angels was degraded to a class of creatures on the same level of humans, thereby emphasizing the omnipresence of God. The 2nd-century rabbi Shimon bar Yochai cursed everyone who explained the term sons of God as angels. He stated sons of God were actually sons of judges or sons of nobles. Evil was no longer attributed to heavenly forces, now it was dealt as an "evil inclination" (yetzer hara) within humans. In some Midrashic works, the "evil inclination" is attributed to Samael, who is in charge of several satans in order to test humanity. Nevertheless, these angels are still subordinate to God; the reacceptance of rebel angels in Midrashic discourse was posterior and probably influenced by the role of fallen angels in Islamic and Christian lore.

Babylonian Talmud 
However, there are several hints spread throughout the Babylonian Talmud witnessing to the sages’ familiarity with the myth of the fallen angels. First, it transmits the word “Azazel”, the name of one of the angelic leaders. In most cases (Yoma 37a, 62a-b, 67b, and Hullin 11b) it is used as a mere toponym, a name of a cliff from which the scapegoat was supposed to be thrown down. Once, in Yoma 67b the sages disclose that the place is called “Azazel” because it atones for the deeds of “Uzza and Azael”, the malicious angels known from the 3 Book of Enoch (3 Enoch 5) for teaching sorcery to the generation of Enosh. Second, Niddah 61a explains that Og, the Rephaite warlord of gigantic height and strength (Deuteronomy 3:11) is the grandson of Shamhazai, the fallen angelic leader known from the 1 Book of Enoch (1 En 6:1-8; 8:1-3), Targum Pseudo-Jonathan to Genesis 6:4, and the Dead Sea Scrolls (4Q201 3:6; 4Q202 2:5, and 4Q530 2:3-23). Third, according to Eruvin 18b after witnessing Cain’s murder Adam decides to abstain from cohabitation with Eve in order not to sire any more potentially wicked offspring. This decision proves to be only partially successful because he experiences ejaculations that led to the formation of demons. The text does not explain who the mother of these creatures is, but according to the version of this tradition transmitted in midrash Genesis Rabbah 20:11 the first couple was seduced by evil spirits and gave birth to even more demons. Fourth, according to Sanhedrin 109a the architects of the Tower of Babel are turned into demons and from the contextual works, both Rabbinic (e.g., Genesis Rabbah 31:12, Deuteronomy Rabbah 184) and Christian (e.g., Praeparatio Evangelica 9.17.2-3, 9.8.12), it is clear that these artisans could be interpreted as giants. From this perspective, the metamorphosis of the builders of Babel into demons parallels the motif of the giants’ cadavers transformed into evil spirits (e.g., 1 Enoch 15:8-12 and Testament of Solomon 70-71). Hence, it could be concluded that the Talmudic rabbis knew at least some elements of the myth of the fallen angels but modified it so as to differentiate from among other religious and cultural traditions of the era.

Post-Talmudic Works 
The idea of rebel angels in Judaism reappears in the Aggadic-Midrashic work Pirke De-Rabbi Eliezer, which shows not one, but two falls of angels. The first one is attributed to Samael, who refuses to worship Adam and objects to God favoring Adam over the angels, ultimately descending onto Adam and Eve to tempt them into sin. This seems rooted in the motif of the fall of Iblis in the Quran and the fall of Satan in the Cave of Treasures. The second fall echoes the Enochian narratives. Again, the "sons of God" mentioned in Gen 6:1–4 are depicted as angels. During their fall, their "strength and stature became like the sons of man" and again, they give existence to the giants by intercourse with human women.

Kabbalah 
Although not strictly speaking fallen, evil angels reappear in Kabbalah. Some of them are named after angels taken from the Enochian writings, such as Samael. According to the Zohar, just as angels can be created by virtue, evil angels are an incarnation of human vices, which derive from the Qliphoth, the representation of impure forces.

However, the Zohar also recalls a narration of two angels in a fallen state, called Aza and Azael. These angels are cast down from the heaven after mistrusting Adam for his inclination towards sin. Once on Earth, they complete the Enochian narrative by teaching magic to humans and producing offspring with them, as well as consorting with Lilith (hailed as "the sinner"). In the narrative, the Zohar affirms but simultaneously prohibits magical practices. As a punishment, God puts the angels in chains, but they still copulate with the demoness Naamah, who gives birth to demons, evil spirits and witches.

Christianity

Bible 
Luke 10:18 refers to "Satan falling from heaven" and Matthew 25:41 mentions "the Devil and his angels", who will be thrown into hell. All Synoptic Gospels identify Satan as the leader of demons. Paul the Apostle (c. 5 – c. 64 or 67) states in 1 Corinthians 6:3 that there are angels who will be judged, implying the existence of wicked angels. 2 Peter 2:4 and Jude 1:6 refer paraenetically to angels who have sinned against God and await punishment on Judgement Day. The Book of Revelation, chapter 12, speaks of Satan as a great red dragon whose "tail swept a third part of the stars of heaven and cast them to the earth". In verses 7–9, Satan is defeated in the War in Heaven against Michael and his angels: "the great dragon was thrown down, that ancient serpent who is called the Devil and Satan, the deceiver of the whole world—he was thrown down to the earth and his angels were thrown down with him". Nowhere within the New Testament writings are fallen angels identified with demons, but by combining the references to Satan, demons and angels, early Christian exegetes equated fallen angels with demons, for which Satan was regarded as the leader.

Origen and other Christian writers linked the fallen morning star of Isaiah 14:12 of the Old Testament to Jesus' statement in Luke 10:18 that he "saw Satan fall like lightning from heaven", as well as a passage about the fall of Satan in Revelation 12:8–9. The Latin word lucifer, as introduced in the late 4th-century AD Vulgate, gave rise to the name for a fallen angel.

Christian tradition has associated Satan not only with the image of the morning star in Isaiah 14:12, but also with the denouncing in Ezekiel 28:11–19 of the king of Tyre, who is spoken of as having been a "cherub". The Church Fathers saw these two passages as in some ways parallel, an interpretation also testified in apocryphal and pseudepigraphic works. However, "no modern evangelical commentary on Isaiah or Ezekiel sees Isaiah 14 or Ezekiel 28 as providing information about the fall of Satan".

Early Christianity 
During the period immediately before the rise of Christianity, the intercourse between the Watchers and human women was often seen as the first fall of the angels. Christianity stuck to the Enochian writings at least until the third century. Many Church Fathers such as Irenaeus, Justin Martyr, Clement of Alexandria and Lactantius accepted the association of the angelic descent myth to the sons of God passage in Genesis 6:1–4. However, some ascetics, such as Origen (c. 184 – c. 253), rejected this interpretation. According to the Church Fathers who rejected the doctrine by Origen, these angels were guilty of having transgressed the limits of their nature and of desiring to leave their heavenly abode to experience sensual experiences. Irenaeus referred to fallen angels as apostates, who will be punished by an everlasting fire. Justin Martyr (c. 100 – c. 165) identified pagan deities as fallen angels or their demonic offspring in disguise. Justin also held them responsible for Christian persecution during the first centuries. Tertullian and Origen also referred to fallen angels as teachers of astrology.

The Babylonian king, who is described as a fallen "morning star" in Isaiah 14:1–17, was probably the first time identified with a fallen angel by Origen. This description was interpreted typologically both as an angel and a human king. The image of the fallen morning star or angel was thereby applied to Satan by early Christian writers, following the equation of Lucifer to Satan in the pre-Christian century.

Catholicism 

The subject of fallen angels is covered in a number of catechisms, including Rev. George Hay's in which he answers the question What was the sin by which they fell?: "It was pride, arising from the great beauty and sublime graces which God had bestowed upon them. For, seeing themselves such glorious beings, they fell in love with themselves, and, forgetting the God that made them, wished to be on an equality with their Creator." The consequence of this fall being that, "they were immediately deprived of all their supernatural graces and heavenly beauty: they were changed from glorious angels into hideous devils; they were banished out of heaven, and condemned to the torments of hell, which was prepared to receive them."

In terms of the history of fallen angel theology it is thought to be rooted in Enochian literature, which Christians began to reject by the third century. The sons of God came to be identified merely with righteous men, more precisely with descendants of Seth who had been seduced by women descended from Cain. The cause of evil was shifted from the superior powers of angels, to humans themselves, and to the very beginning of history; the expulsion of Satan and his angels on the one hand and the original sin of humans on the other hand. However, the Book of Watchers, which identified the sons of God with fallen angels, was not rejected by Syriac Christians or the Ethiopian Orthodox Tewahedo Church. Augustine of Hippo's work Civitas Dei (5th century) became the major opinion of Western demonology and for the Catholic Church. He rejected the Enochian writings and stated that the sole origin of fallen angels was the rebellion of Satan. As a result, fallen angels came to be equated with demons and depicted as non-sexual spiritual entities. The exact nature of their spiritual bodies became another topic of dispute during the Middle Ages. Augustine based his descriptions of demons on his perception of the Greek Daimon. The Daimon was thought to be a spiritual being, composed of ethereal matter, a notion also used for fallen angels by Augustine. However, these angels received their ethereal body only after their fall. Later scholars tried to explain the details of their spiritual nature, asserting that the ethereal body is a mixture of fire and air, but that they are still composed of material elements. Others denied any physical relation to material elements, depicting the fallen angels as purely spiritual entities. But even those who believed the fallen angels had ethereal bodies did not believe that they could produce any offspring.

Augustine, in his Civitas Dei describes two cities (Civitates) distinct from each other and opposed to each other like light and darkness. The earthly city is caused by the act of rebellion of the fallen angels and is inhabited by wicked men and demons (fallen angels) led by Satan. On the other hand, the heavenly city is inhabited by righteous men and the angels led by God. Although, his ontological division into two different kingdoms shows resemblance of Manichean dualism, Augustine differs in regard of the origin and power of evil. In Augustine works, evil originates from free will. Augustine always emphasized the sovereignty of God over the fallen angels. Accordingly, the inhabitants of the earthly city can only operate within their God-given framework. The rebellion of angels is also a result of the God-given freedom of choice. The obedient angels are endowed with grace, giving them a deeper understanding of God's nature and the order of the cosmos. Illuminated by God-given grace, they became incapable of feeling any desire for sin. The other angels, however, are not blessed with grace, thus they remain capable of sin. After these angels decide to sin, they fall from heaven and become demons. In Augustine's view of angels, they cannot be guilty of carnal desires since they lack flesh, but they can be guilty of sins that are rooted in spirit and intellect such as pride and envy. However, after they have made their decision to rebel against God, they cannot turn back. The Catechism of the Catholic Church does not take "the fall of the angels" literally, but as a radical and irrevocable rejection of God and his reign by some angels who, though created as good beings, freely chose evil, their sin being unforgivable because of the irrevocable character of their choice, not because of any defect in infinite divine mercy. Present-day Catholicism rejects Apocatastasis, the reconciliation with God suggested by the Church Father Origen.

Orthodox Christianity

Eastern Orthodox Christianity 
Like Catholicism, Eastern Orthodox Christianity shares the basic belief in fallen angels as spiritual beings who rebel against God. Unlike Catholicism, however, there is no established doctrine about the exact nature of fallen angels, but Eastern Orthodox Christianity unanimously agrees that the power of fallen angels is always inferior to God. Therefore, belief in fallen angels can always be assimilated with local lore, as long it does not break basic principles and is in line with the Bible. Historically, some theologians even tend to suggest that fallen angels could be rehabilitated in the world to come. Fallen angels, just like angels, play a significant role in the spiritual life of believers. As in Catholicism, fallen angels tempt and incite people into sin, but mental illness is also linked to fallen angels. Those who have reached an advanced degree of spirituality are even thought to be able to envision them. Rituals and sacraments performed by Eastern Orthodoxy are thought to weaken such demonic influences.

Ethiopian Church 
Unlike most other Churches, the Ethiopian Church accepts 1 Enoch and the Book of Jubilees as canonical. As a result, the Church believes that human sin does not originate in Adam's transgression alone, but also from Satan and other fallen angels. Together with demons, they continue to cause sin and corruption on earth.

Protestantism 

Like Catholicism, Protestantism continues with the concept of fallen angels as spiritual entities unrelated to flesh, but it rejects the angelology established by Catholicism. Martin Luther's (1483–1546) sermons of the angels merely recount the exploits of the fallen angels, and does not deal with an angelic hierarchy. Satan and his fallen angels are responsible for some misfortune in the world, but Luther always believed that the power of the good angels exceeds those of the fallen ones. The Italian Protestant theologian Girolamo Zanchi (15161590) offered further explanations for the reason behind the fall of the angels. According to Zanchi, the angels rebelled when the incarnation of Christ was revealed to them in incomplete form. While Mainline Protestants are much less concerned with the cause of angelic fall, arguing that it is neither useful nor necessary to know, other Protestant churches do have fallen angels as more of a focus.

Islam 

The concept of fallen angels is debated in Islam. Opposition to the possibility of erring angels can be attested as early as Hasan of Basra. On the other hand Abu Hanifa (d. 767), founder of the Hanafi school of jurisprudence, distinguished between obedient angels, disobedient angels and unbelievers among the angels, who in turn differ from the jinn and devils. Al-Taftazani (1322 AD –1390 AD) argued that angels might slip into error and are rebuked, like Harut and Marut, but could not become unbelievers, like Iblis. Contemporary Muslim scholars have argued, even if fallen angels are considered, they are conceptually different from the fallen angels in Christianity, since they remain at the service of God and do not become God's enemies.

The Quran mentions the fall of Iblis in several Surahs. Surah Al-Anbiya states that angels claiming divine honors were to be punished with hell. Further, Surah 2:102 implies that a pair of fallen angels introduces magic to humanity. However, the latter angels did not accompany Iblis. Fallen angels work in entirely different ways in the Quran and Tafsir. According to the Isma'ilism work Umm al-Kitab, Azazil boasts about himself being superior to God until he is thrown into lower celestial spheres and ends up on earth. Iblis is often described as being chained in the lowest pit of hell (Sijjin) by various scholars, including Fakhr al-Din al-Razi (1150–1210) and commands, according to Al-Tha'alibis (961–1038) Qisas Al-Anbiya, his host of rebel angels (shayāṭīn) and the fiercest jinn (ifrit) from there. In a Shia narrative from Ja'far al-Sadiq (700 or 702–765), Idris (Enoch) meets an angel, which the wrath of God falls upon, and his wings and hair are cut off; after Idris prays for him to God, his wings and hair are restored. In return they become friends and at his request the angel takes Idris to the heavens to meet the angel of death. In Shia traditions, a cherub called Futrus was cast out from heaven and fell to the earth in the form a snake.

Some recent non-Islamic scholars suggest Uzair, who is according to Surah 9:30 called a son of God by Jews, originally referred to a fallen angel. While exegetes almost unanimously identified Uzair as Ezra, there is no historical evidence that the Jews called him son of God. Thus, the Quran may refer not to the earthly Ezra, but to the heavenly Ezra, identifying him with the heavenly Enoch, who in turn became identified with the angel Metatron (also called lesser YHWH) in merkabah mysticism.

Iblis 
The Quran repeatedly tells about the fall of Iblis. According to Quran 2:30, the angels object to God's intention to create a human, because they will cause corruption and shed blood, echoing the account of 1 Enoch and the Book of Jubilees. This happens after the angels observe men causing unrighteousness. However, after God demonstrates the superiority of Adam's knowledge in comparison to the angels, He orders them to prostrate themselves. Only Iblis refuses to follow the instruction. When God asks for the reason behind Iblis' refusal, he boasts about himself being superior to Adam, because he is made of fire. Thereupon God expels him from heaven. In the early Meccan period, Iblis appears as a degraded angel. But since he is called a jinni in Surah 18:50, some scholars argue that Iblis is actually not an angel, but an entity apart, stating he is only allowed to join the company of angels as a reward for his previous righteousness. Therefore, they reject the concept of fallen angels and emphasize the nobility of angels by quoting certain Quranic verses like 66:6 and 16:49, distinguishing between infallible angels and jinn capable of sin. However, the notion of jinni cannot clearly exclude Iblis from being an angel. According to Ibn Abbas, angels who guard the jinan (here: heavens) are called Jinni, just as humans who were from Mecca are called Mecci, but they are not related to the jinn-race. Other scholars assert that a jinn is everything hidden from human eye, both angels and other invisible creatures, thus including Iblis to a group of angels. In Surah 15:36, God grants Iblis' request to prove the unworthiness of humans. Surah 38:82 also confirms that Iblis' intrigues to lead humans astray are permitted by God's power. However, as mentioned in Surah 17:65, Iblis' attempts to mislead God's servants are destined to fail. The Quranic episode of Iblis parallels another wicked angel in the earlier Books of Jubilees: Like Iblis, Mastema requests God's permission to tempt humanity, and both are limited in their power, that is, not able to deceive God's servants. However, the motif of Iblis' disobedience derives not from the Watcher mythology, but can be traced back to the Cave of Treasures, a work that probably holds the standard explanation in Proto-orthodox Christianity for the angelic fall of Satan. According to this explanation, Satan refuses to prostrate himself before Adam, because he is "fire and spirit" and thereupon Satan is banished from heaven. Unlike the majority opinion in later Christianity, the idea that Iblis tries to usurp the throne of God is alien to Islam and due to its strict monotheism unthinkable.

Harut and Marut 
Harut and Marut are a pair of angels mentioned in Surah 2:102 teaching magic. Although the reason behind their stay on earth is not mentioned in the Quran, the following narration became canonized in Islamic tradition. The Quran exegete Tabari attributed this story to Ibn Masud and Ibn Abbas and is also attested by Ahmad ibn Hanbal. Briefly summarized, the angels complain about the mischievousness of mankind and make a request to destroy them. Consequently, God offers a test to determine whether or not the angels would do better than humans for long: the angels are endowed with human-like urges and Satan has power over them. The angels choose two (or in some accounts three) among themselves. However, on Earth, these angels entertain and act upon sexual desires and become guilty of idol worship, whereupon they even kill an innocent witness of their actions. For their deeds, they are not allowed to ascend to heaven again. Probably the names Harut and Marut are of Zoroastrian origin and derived from two Amesha Spentas called Haurvatat and Ameretat. Although the Quran gave these fallen angels Iranian names,  recognized them as from the Book of Watchers. In accordance with 3 Enoch, al-Kalbi (737 AD – 819 AD) named three angels descending to earth, and he even gave them their Enochian names. He explained that one of them returned to heaven and the other two changed their names to Harut and Marut. However, like in the story of Iblis, the story of Harut and Marut does not contain any trace of angelic revolt. Rather, the stories about fallen angels are related to a rivalry between humans and angels. As the Quran affirms, Harut and Marut are sent by God and, unlike the Watchers, they only instruct humans to witchcraft by God's permission, just as Iblis can just tempt humans by God's permission.

Literature 

In the Divine Comedy (1308–1320) by Dante Alighieri, fallen angels guard the City of Dis surrounding the lower circles of hell. They mark a transition: While in previous circles, the sinners are condemned for sins they just could not resist, later on, the circles of hell are filled with sinners who deliberately rebel against God, such as fallen angels or Christian heretics.

In John Milton's 17th-century epic poem Paradise Lost, both obedient and fallen angels play an important role. They appear as rational individuals: their personality is similar to that of humans. The fallen angels are named after entities from both Christian and Pagan mythology, such as Moloch, Chemosh, Dagon, Belial, Beelzebub and Satan himself. Following the canonical Christian narrative, Satan convinces other angels to live free from the laws of God, thereupon they are cast out of heaven. The epic poem starts with the fallen angels in hell. The first portrayal of God in the book is given by fallen angels, who describe him as a questionable tyrant and blame him for their fall. Outcast from heaven, the fallen angels establish their own kingdom in the depths of hell, with a capital called Pandæmonium. Unlike most earlier Christian representations of hell, it is not the primary place for God to torture the sinners, but the fallen angels' own kingdom. The fallen angels even build a palace, play music and freely debate. Nevertheless, without divine guidance, the fallen angels themselves turn hell into a place of suffering.

The idea of fallen angels plays a significant role in the various poems of Alfred de Vigny. In Le Déluge (1823), the son of an angel and a mortal woman learns from the stars about the great deluge. He seeks refuge with his beloved on Mount Ararat, hoping that his angelic father will save them. But since he does not appear, they are caught by the flood. Éloa (1824) is about a female angel created by the tears of Jesus. She hears about a male angel, expelled from heaven, whereupon she seeks to comfort him, but goes to perdition as a consequence.

See also

Notes

Citations

References

Further reading

External links 

 Catholic Encyclopedia: Angels, see section "The Evil Angels"
 Jewish Encyclopedia: Fall of Angels

 
Book of Jubilees
Christian terminology
Second Temple period